On 16 May 2022, hundreds of acres of forest trees were uprooted and hundreds of large trees and shrubs were reduced to ashes in 70% of the forest area, in the hilly area of Makniyal in the Khanpur Tehsil of Haripur District, Khyber Pakhtunkhwa, Pakistan.

See also
 2022 Khyber Pakhtunkhwa wildfires
 Shangla District wildfire

References

2022 in Pakistan
Fires in Pakistan
Wildfires in Pakistan
May 2022 events in Pakistan
2022 wildfires
Haripur District